TMSA may refer to:

 Trimethylsilylacetylene, a chemical compound
 Tanker Management and Self-Assessment programme, developed by the Oil Companies International Marine Forum (OCIMF) to assess ship safety management systems
 Tobacco Master Settlement Agreement
 Thymosin α1, peptide hormone
 Transvaal Museum, South Africa